List of extraterrestrial orbiters is a listing of spacecraft that achieved an extraterrestrial orbit.

Sun

First artificial object on heliocentric orbit was Luna 1 (1959).

Mercury

Venus

Moon

Mars

Jupiter

Saturn

Minor planets and comets

References

See also
 Lunar orbit
 Circumlunar trajectory
 List of minor planets and comets visited by spacecraft
 List of landings on extraterrestrial bodies
 List of interplanetary voyages
 Satellite system (astronomy)

extraterrestrial
extraterrestrial

Non Earth orbiting satellites